Blonde Inspiration is a 1941 American comedy film directed by Busby Berkeley and written by Marion Parsonnet. The film stars John Shelton, Virginia Grey, Albert Dekker, Charles Butterworth, and Donald Meek. The film was released on February 7, 1941, by Metro-Goldwyn-Mayer.

Plot
Aspiring western writer Jonathan moves to NY to try and sell his work. After numerous closed doors, he falls in with unscrupulous pulp magazine publisher Hendricks, who's deeply in debt and sees him as a source of free material, especially after regular writer Dusty refuses to work anymore without getting the money he's owed. Hendricks' secretary Margie feels bad for the deception but goes along with it to keep her own job. More catastrophes, both artistic and romantic, ensue before everything works out.

Cast 
 John Shelton as Jonathan 'Johnny' Briggs
 Virginia Grey as Margie Blake 
 Albert Dekker as Phil Hendricks
 Charles Butterworth as 'Bittsy' Conway
 Donald Meek as 'Dusty' King
 Reginald Owen as Reginald Mason
 Alma Kruger as Victoria Mason
 Rita Quigley as Regina Mason
 Marion Martin as Wanda 'Baby'
 George Lessey as C. V. Hutchins

References

External links 
 
 
 
 

1941 films
1941 comedy films
American black-and-white films
American comedy films
Films about writers
American films based on plays
Films directed by Busby Berkeley
Films scored by Bronisław Kaper
Metro-Goldwyn-Mayer films
1940s English-language films
1940s American films